Life in the Country (Swedish: Livet på landet) is a 1924 Swedish silent drama film directed by Ivan Hedqvist and starring Axel Ringvall, Hedqvist and Mona Mårtenson. It is based on the classic German novel From My Farming Days by Fritz Reuter. It is now considered a lost film. A second Swedish adaptation of the novel Life in the Country was produced in 1943.

The film's sets were designed by the art director Vilhelm Bryde.

Synopsis
A ruthless landowner drives the widowed Karl Hawermann and his daughter Louise from their land.

Cast
 Axel Ringvall as Uncle Zaakarias Bräsig
 Ivan Hedqvist as Karl Hawermann
 Mona Mårtenson as Louise Hawermann
 Axel Hultman as Pomuchelskopp
 Alfred Lundberg as von Rambow
 Richard Lund as Axel von Rambow
 Renée Björling as Frida von Rambow
 Carl Browallius as Vicar Behrens
 Gucken Cederborg as Mrs. Behrens
 Einar Hanson as Frans von Rambow

Preservation status 
Life in the Country is considered a lost film, except a very short fragment that survived in the SVT archive thanks to its inclusion in a newsreel on the occasion of Axel Ringvall's death in 1927.

References

Bibliography
 Tommy Gustafsson. Masculinity in the Golden Age of Swedish Cinema: A Cultural Analysis of 1920s Films. McFarland, 2014.

External links

1924 drama films
Swedish drama films
1924 films
Films directed by Ivan Hedqvist
Swedish silent feature films
Swedish black-and-white films
Lost Swedish films
1924 lost films
Lost drama films
Silent drama films
1920s Swedish films